The 2010 SEC softball tournament was held at Bogle Park on the campus of the University of Arkansas in Fayetteville, Arkansas on May 13 through May 15, 2010. The Alabama Crimson Tide won the tournament for the 4th time in their history, and received the conference's automatic bid to the 2010 NCAA Division I softball tournament.

Tournament

See also
Women's College World Series
NCAA Division I Softball Championship
SEC softball tournament
SEC Tournament

External links
2010 SEC softball tournament

References

SEC softball tournament
2010 Southeastern Conference softball season
SEC Softball
Softball in Arkansas